is a mountain located on Ishigaki Island in Okinawa, Japan. Together, with Kabira Bay, it is a nationally designated Place of Scenic Beauty.

Overview 
It is located on the island of Ishigaki, near the center of the Omoto Mountain Range, which runs east to west along the northern coast of the island.

Geologically, it is formed by granite from the Neogene Period. The Miyara River flowing from the northeast side and the Nagura River flowing from the south side of the mountain are vital sources of drinking and agricultural water on the island.

References

Mountains of Okinawa Prefecture
Places of Scenic Beauty
Highest points of Japanese national parks